Siti Hafar Raihaanun Nabila HM or better known as Raihaanun (born June 7, 1987) is an Indonesian actress  of mixed Bugis and Minangkabau descent.

Biography
Raihaanun who is familiarly called 'Haanun''', began her career as a GADIS Sampul finalist 2003. After that, Haanun starred in several commercials and soap operas. Some soap operas starring the 6 youngest siblings Hazier Moein-Yulia Farahdibha, among others, Sepatu Kaca, Kawin Gantung, Julia Jadi Anak Gedongan, and My Prince n My Monster. She appeared in the remake of Badai Pasti Berlalu (2007), and in the Yanina Cinta soap operas from Prima Entertainment on SCTV in 2002.

Raihaanun married to Teddy Soeriaatmadja, director of the film Badai Pasti Berlalu'' (2007 film) on March 17, 2007. The age range is pretty much the odds 13 years, does not seem to be an obstacle for them.

On January 16, 2008 Haanun gave birth to a son, Millan Haruna Soeriaatmadja.

Soap operas
Sepatu Kaca
Kawin Gantung
Julia Jadi Anak Gedongan
Kehormatan 2
Senandung Masa Puber
Tangisan Anak Tiri
Yanina Cinta
My Prince n My Monster
Cinta Nggak Sempurna (FTV)
Cinta Milik Kita (FTV)
Bibik Saingan Gue (FTV)
Manis Dan Sayang
Astagfirullah
Bunga Di Tepi Jalan
katakan cinta untuk putri

Filmography

Film

Awards and nominations

References 

Indonesian female models
Citra Award winners
Maya Award winners
Indonesian actresses
People from Jakarta
Bugis people
Minangkabau people
1988 births
Living people